The 2022 WAFL season is the 138th season of the various incarnations of the West Australian Football League (WAFL).The season commenced on the 15th of April, and concluded with the Grand Final on the 1st of October, with West Perth defeating Claremont at Leederville Oval by 12 points. Fixtures were released in stages, to allow for COVID flexibility. The first stage saw the first nine rounds of the season be released, rounds 10-14 were released before the start of Round 7 (3 June), and the final rounds (14-20) were released on July 8, before the start of Round 12. All the teams from the previous season have been retained, as there was speculation if the West Coast Eagles reserves would return.

Clubs

Fixtures

Round 1

Round 2

Round 3

Round 4

State Game

Round 5

Round 6

Round 7

Round 8

Round 9

Round 10

Round 12

Round 13

Round 14

Round 15

Round 16

Round 17

Round 18

Round 19

Round 20

Ladder

Finals series

Week one

Week two

Week three

Grand Final

Single Game Records

Individual
 Most Disposals in a match: Jye Bolton, 51 disposals vs. Swan Districts, Steel Blue Oval, Round 4
 Most Kicks in a match: Toby McQuilkin, 33 kicks vs. East Perth, Leederville Oval, Round 8
 Most Handballs in a match: Jesse Turner, 26 handballs vs. Subiaco, Steel Blue Oval, Round 10
 Most Marks in a match: Harry Edwards, 23 marks vs. South Fremantle, Mineral Resources Park, Round 10
 Most Tackles in a match: Haiden Schloithe, 15 tackles vs. East Fremantle, WACA, Round 14
 Most Hitouts in a match: Scott Jones, 62 hitouts vs. Subiaco, Leederville Oval, Round 17
 Most Goals in a match: Jonathon Marsh, 6 goals vs. East Perth, Northampton Community Oval, Round 3
 Most Scoring Shots in a match: Tyler Keitel, 10 shots (5 goals 5 behinds) vs. West Coast WAFL, Pentanet Stadium, Round 5

 Most Disposals in a Finals match: Lachlan Martinis, 34 disposals vs. East Fremantle, New Choice Homes Park, Qualifying Final
 Most Kicks in a Finals match: Cameron Eardley, 26 kicks vs. Claremont, New Choice Homes Park, Qualifying Final
 Most Handballs in a Finals match: Kyle Baskerville, 16 handballs vs. Claremont, New Choice Homes Park, Qualifying Final, Lachlan Martinis, 16 handballs vs. East Fremantle, New Choice Homes Park, Qualifying Final
 Most Marks in a Finals match: Jamie Meade & Cameron Eardley, 10 marks vs. Claremont, New Choice Homes Park, Qualifying Final
 Most Tackles in a Finals match: Mitchell Crowden, 10 tackles vs. South Fremantle, Fremantle Community Bank Oval, Elimination Final
Conal Lynch, 10 tackles vs. Claremont, Leederville Oval, Grand Final
 Most Hitouts in a Finals match: Oliver Eastland, 44 hitouts vs. West Perth, Leederville Oval, Grand Final
 Most Goals in a Finals match: Dylan Main, 4 goals vs. Peel Thunder, Fremantle Community Bank Oval, Elimination Final
 Most Scoring Shots in a Finals match: Dylan Main, 6 scoring shots (4 goals 2 behinds) vs. Peel Thunder, Fremantle Community Bank Oval, Elimination Final, Sam Sturt, 6 scoring shots (3 goals 3 behinds) vs. South Fremantle, Fremantle Community Bank Oval, Elimination Final

Team
 Highest Score: East Fremantle 23.14 (152) vs. Perth, WACA, Round 15
 Lowest Score: West Coast WAFL 1.5 (11) vs. Swan Districts, Steel Blue Oval, Round 17
 Biggest Margin: 123 points – East Fremantle 22.14 (146) vs. West Coast WAFL 3.5 (23), New Choice Homes Park, Round 4
 Highest Losing Score: Peel Thunder 14.9 (93) vs. West Perth 16.8 (104), Lane Group Stadium, Round 2
 Lowest Winning Score: Claremont 5.5 (35) vs. Subiaco 4.4 (28), Leederville Oval, Round 14
 Highest Aggregate Score: 208 points – East Perth 23.14 (152) vs. Perth 9.2 (56), WACA, Round 15
 Lowest Aggregate Score: 63 points – Claremont 5.5 (35) vs. Subiaco 4.4 (28), Leederville Oval, Round 14
 Highest Home-and-Away Season Crowd: 6,023, South Fremantle vs. East Fremantle, Fremantle Community Bank Oval, Round 7
 Lowest Home-and-Away Season Crowd: 419, Subiaco vs West Coast, New Choice Homes Park, Round 16

Awards

Player

Bernie Naylor Medal
Numbers highlighted in blue indicates the player led the Bernie Naylor Medal at the end of that round.
Numbers underlined indicates the player did not play in that round.

For reference, Brayden Noble from Swan Districts was the leader in the Bernie Naylor Medal through the first 2 rounds, kicking 5 in Round 1, and 2 in Round 2, putting him on 7.

Sandover Medal
 Blaine Boekhorst (East Fremantle)

Simpson Medallist (State Game)
 Leigh Kitchin (Subiaco Football Club)

Team
League Minor Premiers
 West Perth

Reserves Minor Premiers
 West Perth

Colts Minor Premiers
West Perth

Rodriguez Shield
 West Perth

Individual Teams
Leading Goal Kickers
The number of goals kicked by each winner will be in brackets
The person that was the Leading Goal Kicker for each grade will be in bold

 West Coast only have a league side

2022 Women's Season

References 

West Australian Football League seasons
W